It Takes Two (simplified Chinese: 对对碰) is a 2012 Singaporean Chinese year-end blockbuster drama produced by MediaCorp TV. It stars Chen Hanwei , Yao Wenlong , Kym Ng , Ann Kok & Zheng Geping as casts of the series. It is currently telecast on Singapore's free-to-air channel, MediaCorp Channel 8. It made its debut on 6 November 2012 and consists of 34 episodes, screened on every weekday night at 9:00pm.

Plot
In a block of 4-room flats at a particular housing estate in Bedok, the two families of Hao Youcai and Niu Wuyin live opposite each other. As business rivals, sparks occasionally fly between them. Youcai's name may mean "wealthy", but he often has no luck with money. On the other hand, the overbearing Wuyin or "penniless" does not only enjoy a thriving business but he has the Midas touch as well. He is certainly loaded with "pounds".

An honest and kind man, Youcai does not have the gift of the gab but is tolerant as far as possible. However, his wife Luona has a vicious tongue that spares nobody for no rhyme or reason. On top of that, she covets wealth and power, despising her low-earning husband. She is tyrannical and harsh towards her 70-year-old mother-in-law. Wuyin's septuagenarian father, however, has a "blessed" life. His son and daughter-in-law treasure him. When he moans about his aching body, a massage chair worth a few thousand dollars is delivered immediately to the house. Youcai's mother can only drool in envy. Wuyin has a way with people and he is eloquent. He remains "refined" even in a quarrel, defusing any tense situation with a soft touch. Money is his life, and he can never earn enough. He is ever ready to perform good deeds, but not when they demand his money. Hardworking and frugal, his wife Xiuhua is not one to complain.

Both families sell "handmade fishball noodles" at their stalls in a food centre. "Niuji" stall enjoys brisk business while "Haoji" stall suffers from poor business.

The sight of the other party decked in jewellery while she is pathetically bare in that aspect makes Luona moan all day to the extent that she pinches her mother-in-law out of spite. Unfortunately, the "act of violence" is captured on camera by her daughter and uploaded to YouTube. It even hits the headlines. In no time, people are demanding that she be punished and going on a hunt to ferret out this wicked woman. Youcai is aware that the culprit is his wife and loses his cool. Instead of being remorseful, Luona flies into a fury. She leaves home with her daughter, threatening to engage a lawyer to initiate divorce proceedings.

Disillusioned, Youcai reaches the point of contemplating suicide but is stopped by his mother. To console her son, she fabricates a story that a deity appeared in her dream to prophesize that his hardship days will soon be over. The deity also bestowed on her a "good luck rice bin" (which is actually a junk she retrieved from the rubbish dump) and promised that the rice bin would always be full and that his life would be free from worry.

Whether it is his filial piety that moves the Heaven or it is simply mere coincidence, Youcai's luck changes for the better the moment his wicked wife leaves home. His fish balls are favoured by a renowned chef and he is invited to appear on TV. He becomes famous overnight. Customers begin to stream towards his stall. Wuyin's business is badly affected and a series of misfortune befalls him. It appears that the wheel of fortune has turned. With Lady Luck smiling on him, Youcai enters a lucky draw and wins a car. Soon, the story of how the "prosperous rice bin" changes his fortune starts to circulate to the point of becoming a legend. Despite Youcai's mother frantically explaining that it is purely nonsense perpetuated by her, nobody is convinced. Hordes of people flock to the rice bin to "seek fortune and lottery numbers". Luona banishes the thought of divorce upon hearing of it. She wants to return home to be a virtuous wife and a filial daughter-in-law. Wuyin, who is down on his luck, actually plans to steal Youcai's "prosperous rice bin"...

Apart from these two families, this drama has a slew of interesting characters, including the "manager" whose job is to assist a loan shark in hosting "overseas talents" (foreign runners); the "Yong Tau Foo Beauty" and her 20-year-old only son who still relies on his mother to trim his nails; the fengshui master who is a quack; new immigrants married to locals who are eager to assimilate into the country; "opposition parties" fond of exaggerating for the shock effect and who "opposes" everything; the Fish Prince who is unfazed by his lowly status but believes that he who tills diligently will reap a bountiful harvest, etc. The stories of these people reflect the everyday issues currently confronting Singaporeans. For example, the hardship imposed on ordinary citizens as a result of the rising cost of living; indulging the next generation and making it even more difficult for children to face challenges; the impact that an aging population has on society; the marginalization of grassroot communities; the widening gulf between people... The 34-episode drama provides light entertainment while pinpointing current issues in a heartwarming and down-to-earth portrayal.

Cast

Hao family

Niu family

Others

Trivia
This is one of two anniversary dramas (the other being period drama Joys of Life) produced in conjunction with MediaCorp's celebration of 30 years of local Chinese drama.
TV host Kym Ng returns to acting after more than three years. She last starred in Table of Glory in 2009.
Aloysius Pang's second television role after taking a 8-year hiatus from acting in 2004.
Filming started on 4 July 2012 and ended by October 2012. Trailers started screening as of 9 October 2012.
There is supposed to be some conversation during the credits reel of the finale which showed some bloopers. However, the front parts were being blocked by the commentary of News Tonight.
Elvin Ng and Foo Fangrong were seen watching the series in episode 15 of I'm in Charge.
Edwin Goh and Damien Teo were seen watching the scene where Zheng Geping accidentally kissed Ann Kok in episode 30 of The Dream Makers II.

Reception
It Takes Two was the second drama to beat the 1-million viewership mark, beating Don't Stop Believin' to gain the mark before the finale on 21 December (episode 34).

Overseas broadcast
This drama is one of the first dramas to be broadcast exclusively in Malaysia after its first telecast of two weeks.

Episodic synopsis

Drama

Online skit

Awards and recognition
The other dramas that are nominated for Best Theme Song are Don't Stop Believin' , Joys of Life, Yours Fatefully & Show Hand. It only won one award which is Young Talent Award.

See also
 List of programmes broadcast by Mediacorp Channel 8

References

External links
Official Website (English)
Official Website (Chinese)

Singapore Chinese dramas
2012 Singaporean television series debuts
Channel 8 (Singapore) original programming